A hazardous material (hazmat) apparatus is a vehicle used by emergency services to respond to calls involving potentially hazardous materials. These vehicles are customized to fit the needs of the agency responsible for the apparatus, which may be a rescue squad, fire department, emergency medical services, law enforcement agency, or military.

A typical hazmat vehicle will have a portion dedicated to a command and communications center. Often fitted with computers, televisions, two-way radios and other equipment. This command center is usually located in a portion of the vehicle that slides out or expands much like is found on a typical recreational vehicle.

Hazmat vehicles also often come with a portable lab complete with sinks and fume hoods that allow for the analysis of samples collected at the scene. Essentially a mobile laboratory, this allows early on-site scientific analysis and monitoring to speed up the detection process and allow firefighters and other emergency services to provide the correct response for the particular incident.

In the United States, NFPA regulation 471 Recommended Practice For Responding To Hazardous Materials Incidents outlines the equipment required for a hazmat apparatus including a radiation detector, pH meter and other air sampling devices.

Some equipment found on hazmat vehicles include:
 Containment booms to contain spills of non-miscible materials
 Personal protective equipment such as self-contained breathing apparatus and hazmat suits

References

Fire service vehicles
Trucks